Rota's excluded minors conjecture is one of a number of conjectures made by mathematician Gian-Carlo Rota. It is considered to be an important problem by some members of the structural combinatorics community. Rota conjectured in 1971 that, for every finite field, the family of matroids that can be represented over that field has only finitely many excluded minors.
A proof of the conjecture has been announced by Geelen, Gerards, and Whittle.

Statement of the conjecture
Not every matroid has a representation over every field, for instance, the Fano plane is representable only over fields of characteristic two. Other matroids are representable over no fields at all. The matroids that are representable over a particular field form a proper subclass of all matroids.

A minor of a matroid is another matroid formed by a sequence of two operations: deletion and contraction. It follows from this if a matroid is representable over a field, then so are all its minors.

For representability over the real numbers, there are infinitely many forbidden minors. Rota's conjecture is that, for every finite field , there is only a finite number of forbidden minors.

Partial results
W. T. Tutte proved that the binary matroids (matroids representable over the field of two elements) have a single forbidden minor, the uniform matroid  (geometrically, a line with four points on it).

A matroid is representable over the ternary field GF(3) if and only if it does not have one or more of the following four matroids as minors: a five-point line , its dual matroid  (five points in general position in three dimensions), the Fano plane, or the dual of the Fano plane. Thus, Rota's conjecture is true in this case as well.

There are seven forbidden minors for the matroids representable over GF(4). They are:
The six-point line .
The dual  to the six-point line, six points in general position in four dimensions.
A self-dual six-point rank-three matroid with a single three-point line.
The non-Fano matroid formed by the seven points at the vertices, edge midpoints, and centroid of an equilateral triangle in the Euclidean plane. This configuration is one of two known sets of planar points with fewer than  two-point lines.
The dual of the non-Fano matroid.
The eight-point matroid of a square antiprism. 
The matroid obtained by relaxing the unique pair of disjoint circuit-hyperplanes of the square antiprism.
This result won the 2003 Fulkerson Prize for its authors Jim Geelen, A. M. H. Gerards, and A. Kapoor.

For GF(5), several forbidden minors on up to 12 elements are known, but it is not known whether the list is complete.

Reported proof
Geoff Whittle announced during a 2013 visit to the UK that he, Jim Geelen, and Bert Gerards had solved Rota's Conjecture.  The collaboration involved intense visits where the researchers sat in a room together, all day every day, in front of a whiteboard. It would take them years to write up their research in its entirety and publish it. An outline of the proof has appeared in the Notices of the AMS.

See also
Rota's basis conjecture, a different conjecture by Rota about linear algebra and matroids

References

Matroid theory